The action of 31 May 1762 was a minor naval engagement that took place off the Spanish coast off Cadiz, between a British Royal Naval frigate and a sloop against a Spanish frigate during the recently declared Anglo-Spanish War (1762–63). When the Spanish ship surrendered, it was found that she carried a large cargo of gold and silver that would lead to the greatest amount of prize money awarded to British warships.

Background
The war with Spain was only four months old when the Royal Navy sent a blockading force to the Spanish coast. The aims of the  blockade were to block the dispatch of Spanish reinforcements to the Caribbean where Havana was under British siege, and to impede Spanish operations against Gibraltar or in the Mediterranean.

Action
On 15 May 1762 Captain Herbert Sawyer's frigate, the 28-gun , was sailing in company with the 18-gun sloop , Captain Philemon Pownoll, off the coast of Spain near the port of Cadiz. There they sighted the 26-gun Spanish frigate Hermione.

The Hermione, under Lieutenant Juan de Zabaleta, had sailed from Callao, west of Lima on 6 January 1762, prior to, and probably ignorant of, the declaration of the Anglo-Spanish War. On sighting the Active and Favourite in the morning, the officers were slow to prepare for battle, only relocating officers and passengers to make way for the gunners by ten o'clock. The guns were not prepared and the path to the powder magazine was cluttered. At one in the afternoon the British ships tacked and started to head toward the Hermione. At three o'clock lieutenant Francisco Javier Morales de los Rios, in charge of artillery, warned Zableta to call battle stations who inexplicably responded by refusing to do so until after dinner at five o'clock.

The British vessels came up beside Herminone and fired a few rounds. The Spanish replied with a broadside, and then both Active and Favourite let loose their broadsides. Soon Hermione only had her mizzen mast still standing. As his casualties rose, and having lost the ability to manoeuvre, the Spanish captain struck.

There was confusion and misunderstanding between the Spanish officers and the Hermione only managed two broadsides. When Zableta struck his colours he stated that the English had confused the Hermione for a  French frigate though Morales was preparing to continue fire. When the English boarded, Lieutenant Zabaleta surrendered without the agreement of the other officers.

The British soon took possession; only then did they realize this was no ordinary frigate as they discovered the riches on board. Hermione had been bound for Cadiz with a cargo of bags of dollars, gold coin, ingots of gold and silver, cocoa, and blocks of tin.

Her captors took Hermione into Gibraltar, and she was eventually condemned as a prize, with her contents, hull, and fittings valued at £519,705 10s 0d, approximately £ at today's prices. Pownoll and Sawyer each received captain's shares of the prize money of £64,872, approximately £ at today's prices. Ordinary seamen received £480 each, equivalent to thirty years' wages. The prize award is still a record.

Consequences
Sawyer and Pownoll were now suddenly extremely wealthy. Pownoll used his money to buy the Sharpham estate at Ashprington, and to build a large house there designed by Robert Taylor and with gardens designed by Capability Brown. It was about this time that he commissioned a portrait from Sir Joshua Reynolds.

In contrast, on returning to Spain, Zableta was tried in a court-martial held aboard the Guerrero in the port of Cadiz and sentenced to death. He was later pardoned by Charles III of Spain and instead, dismissed from the Navy and served ten years in prison despite an appeal for his release and an offer to fund construction of a frigate to replace the lost vessel. Morales de los Rios was suspended for two years, during which he served in Xebecs. Another officer, Lieutenant Lucas Galves, was suspended for one year.

See also
 Great Britain in the Seven Years' War

References
Notes

Bibliography
 

Conflicts in 1762
Naval battles of the Seven Years' War
Naval battles involving Spain
Naval battles involving Great Britain
Anglo-Spanish War (1762–1763)